Mesedoy (Mesada)  is a rural locality (a selo) in Vedensky District, Chechnya.

Administrative and municipal status 
Municipally, Mesedoy is incorporated into Guninskoye rural settlement. It is one of the four settlements included in it.

Geography 

Mesedoy is located in the upper reaches of one of the left tributaries of the Gums River.

The nearest settlements to Mesedoy are Guni in the north-west, Nizhny Kurchali and Shirdi-Mokhk in the north-east, Ersenoy in the south-east, and Agishbatoy in the south-west.

History 
In 1944, after the genocide and deportation of the Chechen and Ingush people and the Chechen-Ingush ASSR was abolished, the village of Mesedoy was renamed, and settled by people from the neighboring republic of Dagestan. From 1944 to 1957, it was a part of the Vedensky District of the Dagestan ASSR.

In 1958, after the Vaynakh people returned and the Chechen-Ingush ASSR was restored, the village regained its old Chechen name, Mesada.

Population 
 1990 Census: 110
 2002 Census: 144
 2010 Census: 227

According to the results of the 2010 Census, the majority of residents of Mesedoy were ethnic Chechens.

Infrastructure 
The village of Mesedoy hosts one primary school.

References 

Rural localities in Vedensky District